Trinity is a city in Randolph County, North Carolina, United States. The population was 7,006 at the 2020 census. Trinity is part of the Greensboro-High Point Metropolitan Statistical Area of the Piedmont Triad metro region.

History
The community was named after Trinity College, which later became Duke University. Trinity College started as Brown's Schoolhouse, a private subscription school founded in 1838. The school was organized by a group of Methodists and Quakers, and was officially started by Hezekiah Leigh, who was also a founder of Randolph-Macon College. In 1841 North Carolina issued a charter for Union Institute Academy. The school took the name Trinity College in 1859, and in 1892, the college moved to Durham.

Sealy Corporation, the world's largest manufacturer of bedding products with sales of $1.2 billion in 2003, is headquartered in Trinity.

Notable people

Former baseball player Gil English died in Trinity, North Carolina. Trinity is also home to NASCAR Sprint Cup Series drivers Bobby Labonte, Brian Vickers and Kyle Petty. The former "World's Longest Hot Wheels Track" was built at the Kyle Petty Farm in Trinity on May 9, 1999.

Geography
Trinity is located at  (35.873522, -80.010158).

Demographics

2020 census

As of the 2020 United States census, there were 7,006 people, 2,576 households, and 1,981 families residing in the city.

2000 census
As of the census of 2000, there were 6,690 people, 2,638 households, and 2,057 families residing in the city. The population density was 395.9 people per square mile (152.8/km). There were 2,759 housing units at an average density of 163.3 per square mile (63.0/km). The racial composition of the city was: 93.05% White, 5.04% Black or African American, 0.91% Hispanic or Latino American, 0.54% Asian American, 0.63% Native American, 0.01% Native Hawaiian or Other Pacific Islander, 0.33% some other race, and 0.40% two or more races.

There were 2,638 households, out of which 30.5% had children under the age of 18 living with them, 63.3% were married couples living together, 10.4% had a female householder with no husband present, and 22.0% were non-families. 18.3% of all households were made up of individuals, and 6.7% had someone living alone who was 65 years of age or older. The average household size was 2.54 and the average family size was 2.86. Trinity has a low rate of studio and one bedroom rentals compared to many cities; it also has a low rate of people living alone.

In the city, the population was spread out, with 22.5% under the age of 18, 6.9% from 18 to 24, 29.1% from 25 to 44, 29.7% from 45 to 64, and 11.8% who were 65 years of age or older. The median age was 40 years. For every 100 females, there were 97.7 males. For every 100 females age 18 and over, there were 94.8 males.

The median income for a household in the city was $43,277, and the median income for a family was $48,838. Males had a median income of $35,498 versus $22,208 for females. The per capita income for the city was $21,068. About 6.1% of families and 8.6% of the population were below the poverty line, including 12.0% of those under age 18 and 12.0% of those age 65 or over.

Education

Randolph County School System operates public schools including Trinity High School.

See also
 List of municipalities in North Carolina

References

External links

 
 Archdale/Trinity Chamber of Commerce

Cities in North Carolina
Cities in Randolph County, North Carolina